Events in the year 2023 in Andorra.

Incumbents 

 Co-Princes: Emmanuel Macron and Joan Enric Vives Sicília
 Prime Minister: Xavier Espot Zamora

Events 
Ongoing — COVID-19 pandemic in Andorra

 February 17 – Same-sex marriage will become legal in Andorra.

Sports 

 2022–23 Primera Divisió

References 

 
2020s in Andorra
Years of the 21st century in Andorra
Andorra
Andorra